Ulic may refer to:

Ulič, a village and municipality in Slovakia
Ulic Qel-Droma, a Jedi/Sith Star Wars character in the Tales of the Jedi series